"He Did with Me" is a song by Vicki Lawrence, an American pop music singer, actress, and comedienne. It was the second of two releases from her 1973 Bell Records debut album.

The song was a number-one hit on the Australian Kent Music Report after its release.  It was also a hit in the United States and Canada, falling short of the Pop Top 40 but reaching the Top 20 on the Adult Contemporary charts of both nations.

The song did well in Minneapolis, where it reached #18 on WDGY-AM.

Chart performance

Weekly charts

Year-end charts

References

External links
 

1973 singles
Vicki Lawrence songs
Bell Records singles
Song recordings produced by Snuff Garrett
1973 songs
Number-one singles in Australia
Torch songs